Achille Bocchi (Achilles Bocchius) (1488 – 6 November 1562), of Bologna, was an Italian humanist writer, emblematist, historian and lector in Greek, poetry and "humanae litterae" at the University of Bologna. He is best known for his emblem book Symbolicarum quaestionum de universo genere from 1555, which "takes as its subject the whole of universal knowledge: physics, metaphysics, theology, dialectic, Love, Life and Death, packaging them under the veil of fables and myths." It borrowed from Francesco Colonna. The title page put it in the tradition of serio ludere. Bocchi was a friend of Giovanni Pierio Valeriano Bolzanio, and his work is related to Valeriano's Hieroglyphica.

Bocchi was the leader of an informal academy, the Accademia Bocchiana, under the protection of Cardinal Alessandro Farnese, nephew of the Farnese Pope Paul III. For Bocchi Giacomo Barozzi da Vignola, recently returned from Fontainebleau, designed the Palazzo Bocchi, Bologna,  about 1545 (built 1545-55); for the façade Bocchi provided two inscriptions, one in Latin, the other in Hebrew, that run along the rusticated base of the front.

Notes

References
Elizabeth See Watson (1993). Achille Bocchi and the Emblem Book as Symbolic Form
Anne Rolet (2015) . Les Questions symboliques d'Achille Bocchi. (Symbolicae Quaestiones, 1555), Presses Universitaires François-Rabelais/Presses Universitaires de Rennes, 2015, 1610 pages ; . This is the first critical edition of Bocchi's emblems: Volume 1 (630p.) presents a thorough introduction and the edited worf itself with apparatus; Volume 2 (960p.) offers a French translation in verse of each emblem, with notes and commentaries aiming at helping readers find their way through the book's rich network of references and sophisticated allusions.
Anne Rolet (2019). Dans le cercle d’Achille Bocchi : culture emblématique et pratiques académiques à Bologne au XVIe siècle, Presses universitaires François-Rabelais, 2019, . This is the first critical edition, with introduction, translation and notes, of three original neo-latin texts written in the cultural surrounding of the Academia Bocchiana in Renaissance Bologna. Two are by Bocchi himself : the Democritus or On Vanity, is a serio-comic praelectio very much influenced by Antonio Urceo Codro, Pietro Crinito and Erasmus ; the Ptolemaeus or What is the Prince's Duty Against Those Who Disparage Him is a political dialogue between Claudio Tolomei, Annibale Caro and Gabriele Cesano whose main political topics are inspired by ancient historians and Machiavel. The third text, a Little Commentary on Achille Bocchi's Symbol 10 by the Aristotelian philosopher Giovanni Antonio Delfinio, is a very precious testimony about the interpretative methods humanists of the 16th century followed to decrypt emblematic literary productions : Delfinio's commentary is of great help to understand Bocchi's emblem, where the antique Ikarios bas-relief is seen through the sixth Eglogue of Virgil.

External links

 Biography
1555 edition of 'Symbolicarum Quaestionum de Universo Genere' at Internet Archive
1574 edition of 'Symbolicarum Quaestionum de Universo Genere' at Internet Archive

1488 births
1562 deaths
Italian male writers
Italian Renaissance humanists
16th-century Italian writers
Academic staff of the University of Bologna